Parslow is a surname. Notable people with the surname include:

Alice Parslow, character in Book of Dust
Daniel Parslow (born 1985), Welsh footballer
Frederick Daniel Parslow (1856–1915), English recipient of the Victoria Cross
Fred Parslow (1932–2017), Australian actor
John Parslow (British Army officer) (d. 1786), British Army general
Joseph Parslow (1812–1898), English manservant
Len Parslow (1909–1963), English cricketer